The Kukpuk River (Iñupiaq: Kuukpak) is a stream, about  long, in the western North Slope Borough of the U.S. state of Alaska. It flows generally west from the De Long Mountains across the Lisburne Peninsula to Marryat Inlet on the Chukchi Sea.

The Inuit name "Kuukpak" means "big river". A late 19th-century variant was "Kookpuk".

See also
List of rivers of Alaska

References

Rivers of North Slope Borough, Alaska
Rivers of Alaska
Drainage basins of the Chukchi Sea